George Acworth (1534–1578?) was an English protestant divine and civil lawyer of the 16th century.

Acworth was educated at Peterhouse, Cambridge. During the reign of Queen Mary, he travelled in France and Italy, where he studied civil law. In 1560, he was public orator at Cambridge; and, in the following year, was created doctor of laws.

In 1562, he was admitted as an advocate in the Arches Court; and afterwards lived in the family of archbishop Parker, who gave him a prebend of North Muskham in Southwell. In 1567, he was vicar-general to Robert Horne, bishop of Winchester; and, in 1575, the archbishop of Canterbury permitted him to hold the rectory of Ellington, alias Wroughton, in the Diocese of Sarum, with any benefice.

In 1576, he was appointed master of the faculties, and judge of the prerogative court, in Ireland, after he had been turned out of all the situations he held in England, because of his dissolute conduct. The date of his death is uncertain.

Acworth wrote: Orationem encomiasticam in restitutione Buceri et Fagii, printed in Hist. Buceri, Argentor, 1562 (re Martin Bucer & Paul Fagius); the preface to Book II of Bucer's works, fol. Basil, 1577; De visibili Romanarchia, contra Nic. Sanderi Monarchiam, London, 1622. This was written while he lived with archbishop Parker, and probably at his instigation; Nicolas Sanderus had written Monarchia. At one time, he enjoyed the confidence of archbishop Parker, and assisted him in his Antiquitates Britannicae.

References

Chalmers, A. (1812–17). The General Biographical Dictionary 32 v.
Dictionary of National Biography

Further reading
  43 pages.

1534 births
1570s deaths
16th-century English Anglican priests
Fellows of Peterhouse, Cambridge
16th-century English theologians
16th-century Protestant theologians
Irish ecclesiastical judges